Hryhorii Vasylovych Tereshchuk (born October 1, 1954 in Vybudov) - Ukrainian teacher, doctor of pedagogical sciences (1995), professor (1996), and corresponding member of the National Academy of Pedagogical Sciences of Ukraine (2003).

Knight of the Order of Merit of the III degree (2021), Honored Worker of education of Ukraine (2015); award badges "Petro Mogila" and "Excellent student of education of Ukraine".

Biography 
Graduated from the Ternopil Pedagogical Institute (1976). He worked as a teacher in Skalat, Podvolochisky district. From 1978 — at the Ternopil Pedagogical Institute (now TNPU): head of labor training, head of training workshops, Senior Lecturer, Associate Professor of the Department of pedagogical skills (1978-1995), vice — rector for research (1995-2006), from 1998-head of the Department of labor training, from 2006-first vice-rector.

Member of the editorial board of the All-Ukrainian Journal "labor training in educational institutions" and other publications.

Editor-in-chief of the publication "Scientific notes of Ternopil Pedagogical University. Series: pedagogy".

Scientific activity 
Author of more than 80 scientific and methodological works, including 3 monographs, 8 manuals.

References

Sources 
 Б. Петраш, Г. Яворський, Терещук Григорій Васильович // Тернопільський енциклопедичний словник : у 4 т. / редкол.: Г. Яворський та ін., Тернопіль: Видавничо-поліграфічний комбінат «Збруч», 2008, Т. 3: П — Я, s. 414, ISBN 978-966-528-279-2.
 Терещук Григорій Васильович // ТНПУ ім. В. Гнатюка.

Living people
1954 births